In taxonomy, Methanospirillum is a genus of microbes within the family Methanospirillaceae. All its species are methanogenic archaea. The cells are bar-shaped and form filaments.  Most produce energy via the reduction of carbon dioxide with hydrogen, but some species can also use formate as a substrate.  They are Gram-negative and move using archaella on the sides of the cells. They are strictly anaerobic, and they are found in wetland soil and anaerobic water treatment systems.

Phylogeny
The currently accepted taxonomy is based on the List of Prokaryotic names with Standing in Nomenclature (LPSN) and National Center for Biotechnology Information (NCBI).

See also
 List of Archaea genera

References

Further reading

Scientific journals

Scientific books

Scientific databases

External links

Archaea genera
Euryarchaeota